Associazione Calcio Castellettese is an Italian association football club located in Castelletto sopra Ticino, Piedmont. It currently plays in Group A of the Eccellenza Piedmont, after having been directly relegated from Serie D in 2006/07. Its colors are white and blue.

External links
 Official homepage 
 Castellettese page @ Serie-D.com

Association football clubs established in 1943
Football clubs in Piedmont and Aosta Valley
1943 establishments in Italy